Jaú River may refer to:

 Jaú River (Amazonas), Brazil
 Jaú River (São Paulo), Brazil

See also 
 Jau (disambiguation)